Niceville Senior High School (NHS) is a public high school in the city of Niceville, Florida. It is ranked as the top high school within its high-performing Okaloosa County School District. In 1996 NHS was selected as one of 226 secondary schools (private and public) to be designated as a Blue Ribbon School of Excellence. NHS was also named a New American High School in 1999, one of only 13 in the nation to earn that honor that year. The State of Florida Department of Education rated the school an A+ in 2001, 2002, 2003, and 2005.

The current location of NHS on John Sims Parkway was not the original site of the school, opened in 1964; NHS was initially located in a dance hall on Howell Avenue and once held classes at what is now Edge Elementary.

Athletics 

Niceville High School's first state title came in 1987 when the boys' cross country team won the state title in Titusville, FL.

 NHS won the state championship in football in 1988, while the 2009 and 2013 football teams placed second in the state.
 The NHS girls' cross-country team won the state championship in 1994 and were runners-up in 1995, and were crowned state champions in 2016 and runners-up in 2015.
 The 2011 softball team won the state championship in Clermont, FL, defeating Bartow High School 2-1.
 The 2011 girls' golf team won the state championship at Mission Inn Resort. 
 The 2014 girls' tennis team won the state championship in Seminole, FL.
 The 2017 varsity boys' tennis team won the FHSAA 3-A Florida High School Athletics Association State Tennis Championship runner-up title. This was the top performance in the history of NHS boys' tennis.
 The 2020 varsity boys' soccer team won the 6-A state championship, defeating South Broward High School 7-3. 
 The weightlifting program between both the mens and women's teams has produced a total of 8 individual state champions(with 11 state championships) with the boys team finishing as state-runner up in 2022, the highest in school history.
 Individual weightlifting state champions are as follows: Kedra Malone (1990) Ozie Wilhite (1990) Scott Holmes (1996,1997) Nicholas Chislar (1997,1998) Will Jones (2008) David Jones (2011) Melaina Bryant (2019,2020) Kaleb Carter (2022)
 NHS varsity cheerleading team won state championship in 2019, 2020, and 2021 as well as a UCA National Champion title in gameday. 
 NHS junior varsity cheerleading team won two UCA National Champion titles in 2020, one in traditional and one in gameday.

Student activities 
Students recently were sent to Plymouth, England to participate in the Natural Geography In-Shore Areas project sponsored by the University of Kyoto, Japan. Niceville High School is the only high school in the United States that is a part of the NaGISA Project.

In 2003 a team from NHS posted 43rd out of almost 200 teams in the Super Bowl of High School Calculus.

The Niceville High School forensics team has won many competitions in the south Florida region, including the University of Blue Key Tournament.

In the Xcellent 25 Writers' Poll Niceville is currently ranked seventh.

Robotics Team 
The 2018 FIRST Robotics Competition team ranked first at the regional competition in Huntsville, Alabama (the only competition in Alabama) moving on to the FIRST Championship in Houston. They have been to the world competition five times, including three times since 2013. While the team is associated with the school, they do most of their meets off campus at the Neiger Education Robotics Facility, a 6000-square-foot workshop built by mentors, alumni and students.

FL-33RD AFJROTC 

Niceville High School also supports an Air Force Junior Reserve Officer Training Corps program. The Corps is sponsored by the nearby the Eglin AFB's 33rd Fighter Wing. The Corps has four drill teams, Armed Regulation, Un-Armed Regulation, Armed Exhibition, and Un-Armed Exhibition, in addition to an Honor Guard, Sabre Team, and a Rocket Team that fires off rockets during the National Anthem at home football games.

NHS Eagle Pride 

With more than 300 members, the Niceville High School Eagle Pride is one of the largest high school bands in the region. They most recently attended the 2012 Macy's Thanksgiving Day Parade in NYC, New York, and in the same year their Wind Ensemble was one of the select few high school concert bands to perform at CBDNA in Columbus, Georgia. In 2005 the Eagle Pride marched in the Fiesta Bowl Parade and took fourth place in the national marching band contest associated with the parade. In 2008, the Niceville High School Eagle Pride participated in the Tournament of Roses Parade and Bandfest. In 2010, the Niceville Wind Ensemble performed at Carnegie Hall in New York City. They perform every year at the Southeastern States Marching Festival at Troy University in Troy, Alabama. In 2010, the Eagle Pride was chosen to march in the 2012 Macy's Thanksgiving Day Parade. In 2015, the Niceville High School Eagle Pride was selected to attend the 2017 Rose Parade for the 2nd time in school history. They also where selected to attend the Rose Parade for the 3rd time in 2024.

Principals 
 Charlie Marello (2016–present)
 Jeff Palmer (2014–2016)
 Rodney Nobles (2012–2014)
 Marcus Chambers (2011–2012)
 Dr. Linda Smith, Ed.D. (2007–2011)
 Dr. Janie Varner, Ed.D. (2001–2007)
 Dr. David Morgan, Ed.D. (1994–2000)
 Jeanette Rhodes (1988–1994)
 Ashley Hutcheson (1971–1988)
 Colly V. Williams (1968–1971)
 Orus E. Kinney (1964–1968)

Notable alumni 

Lewis Billups, former NFL player, Cincinnati Bengals
Roy Finch, Canadian Football League player
Matt Gaetz, U.S. Representative for congressional district FL-1
Cris Judd, professional dancer once married to Jennifer Lopez
Kevin Knox, former NFL player, Arizona Cardinals, father of Kevin Knox II
Jimmy Nelson, MLB Pitcher
Pam Oliver, Fox Sports sideline analyst
Craig Page, former NFL player (did not graduate from NHS)
Julian Pittman, former NFL player, New Orleans Saints
Conrad Ricamora, Broadway performer and television actor
Alan Ritchson, actor, singer and songwriter, model
Ricky Thomas, former NFL player and coach
Toby Turner, YouTube personality

References

External links 
 Official Niceville High School

High schools in Okaloosa County, Florida
Public high schools in Florida
1964 establishments in Florida
Educational institutions established in 1964